Mengmao is a city town of Ruili, Yunnan, China.

Mengmao or Mongmao is may refer to:
Ruili, city of Yunnan, China, with the Tai Nuea name of "Mengmao"
Möng Mao, ancient state based in Ruili during 13c. to 15c.
Chiefdom of Mengmao, tusi chiefdom based in Ruili during 17c. to 20c.
Mongmao, a town in Wa state, Myanmar
Mongmao Township, a township in Wa state, Myanmar